Yesod (Hebrew: יְסוֹד Yəsōḏ, Tiberian: Yăsōḏ, "foundation") is a sephirah or node in the kabbalistic Tree of Life, a system of Jewish philosophy. Yesod, located near the base of the Tree, is the sephirah below Hod and Netzach, and above Malkuth (the kingdom). It is seen as a vehicle allowing movement from one thing or condition to another (the power of connection). Yesod, Kabbalah, and the Tree of Life are Jewish concepts adopted by various philosophical systems including Christianity, New Age Eastern-based mysticism, and Western esoteric practices.

Jewish Kabbalah
According to Jewish Kabbalah, Yesod is the foundation upon which God has built the world.  It also serves as a transmitter between the sephirot above, and the reality below.  The light of the upper sephirot gather in Yesod and are channelled to Malkuth below.  In this manner, Yesod is associated with the sexual organs.  The masculine Yesod collects the vital forces of the sephirot above, and transmits these creative and vital energies into the feminine Malkuth below.  Yesod channels, Malkuth receives.  In turn, it is through Malkuth that the earth is able to interact with the divinity.

Yesod plays the role of collecting and balancing the different and opposing energies of Hod and Netzach, and also from Tiferet above it, storing and distributing it throughout the world. It is likened to the 'engine-room' of creation. The Cherubim is the angelic choir connected to Yesod, headed by the Archangel Gabriel. In contrast, the demonic order in the Qliphothic sphere opposite of Yesod is Gamaliel, ruled by the Archdemon Lilith.

Other systems

Christianity

According to Jewish Kaballistic philosophy, Yesod is responsible for the powers of communication, connection and contact with external reality within the soul, unifying the material world of Malkuth with the other Sephiroth. Therefore, some Christians compare Yesod to the third person of the Holy Trinity, the Holy Spirit.  The Holy Spirit is defined by some Christians as one aspect of the Triune God.

Esotericism
In Western esotericism, according to the writer Dion Fortune, Yesod is considered to be "of supreme importance to the practical occultist...the Treasure House of Images, the sphere of Maya, Illusion."

References

External links
 Sefirot Yesod (at Inner.org)
 Yesod: The Translator
 Lessons in Tanya

Sephirot
Kabbalistic words and phrases
Jewish symbols
Christian Kabbalah
Hermetic Qabalah
Kabbalah